Ogata (written: 尾形, 緒方, 緒形, 小形, 小県 or 尾方) is a Japanese surname. Notable people with the surname include:
 
, Japanese stock car racing driver
, Japanese chemist
, Japanese sprint canoeist
, Japanese painter
, Japanese actor and comedian
, Japanese actor
, Japanese kickboxer
, Japanese actor and voice actor
, Japanese potter and painter
, Japanese physician
, Japanese painter
, Japanese baseball player
Masafumi Ogata (born 1968), Japanese video game composer
, Japanese Go player
, Japanese voice actress and singer
, Japanese voice actor
Paul Ogata (born 1968), American comedian
, Japanese vocalist
, Japanese nobleman
, Japanese diplomat and academic
, Japanese freestyle swimmer
, Japanese newspaper editor and politician
, Japanese long-distance runner
, Japanese mathematical physicist
, Japanese sport climber and boulderer
, Japanese politician

Fictional characters
, a character in the video game The Idolmaster Cinderella Girls
, a character in the light novel series Shakugan no Shana
, protagonist of the manga series Rideback
, a character in the manga series Golden Kamuy

Japanese-language surnames